A flock is a large group of animals, especially birds, sheep, or goats. Flock or flocking also may refer to:

Computing
 Flock (messaging service), a communication app for teams
 Flock (web browser), a discontinued web browser
 Flock system call, used for computer file locking
 F-Lock, a function lock key on a computer keyboard

Entertainment
 Flock (sculpture), a sculpture by Michael Christian
 Flock (Bell X1 album)
Flock (Jane Weaver album)
 Flock (upcoming video game), an upcoming video game by Hollow Ponds and Richard Hogg
 The Flock (band), a 1969–1970 progressive rock band fronted by violinist Jerry Goodman
 The Flock (album), by The Flock
 The Flock (film), a film starring Richard Gere
 The Flock, a novel by James Robert Smith
 Flock!, a 2009 video game published by Capcom
 Raven's Nest, a professional wrestling stable alternatively called The Flock
 The Flock (video game), a multiplayer-only survival horror video game
 Flocking (film), a 2015 Swedish film

People
 The Flock brothers, who were pioneers of NASCAR stock-car racing, including:
 Bob Flock (1918–1964)
 Fonty Flock (1920–1972)
 Tim Flock (1924–1998)
 Carmella Flöck (1898–1982), courier for the Austrian Resistance 1938–1942
 Dirk Flock (born 1972), German professional football player and manager
 Dorothea Flock (1608–1630), German woman convicted of witchcraft
 Hans Flock (born 1940), Norwegian judge
 Janine Flock (born 1989), Austrian skeleton racer
 Kendra Flock (born 1985), Canadian soccer player
 Robert Herman Flock (born 1956), American prelate of the Roman Catholic Church

Science
 Flocking agent, in chemistry, a substance added to a fluid to remove suspended particles
 Flocking (behavior), the collective motion of a large number of self-propelled entities
 Flock, a collective noun for various animal groups:
 Flock (birds), a group of birds
 Flock, a herd of sheep, goats or similar animals
 Flock, a crowd of people
 Species flock, a diverse group of closely related species in an isolated area
 A series of CubeSat satellites produced by Planet Labs:
 Flock-1, launched 2014
 Flock-2, series started in 2016

Other
 Flock, wool or cotton fiber stuffing in furniture and mattresses
 Flocking (texture), or modeling flock, the material and process of adding small particles to a surface for the sake of texture
 Flock (literary journal), formerly Fiction Fix

See also
 
 
 Flock bronzewing or flock pigeon (Phaps histrionica), an Australian species of bird
 Congregation (disambiguation)
 Flocke, a female polar bear
 Phlox